Papaver orientale, the Oriental poppy, is a perennial flowering plant native to the Caucasus, northeastern Turkey, and northern Iran.

Oriental poppies grow a mound of leaves that are hairy and finely dissected in spring. They gather energy and bloom in mid-summer.  After flowering the foliage dies away entirely, a property that allows their survival in the summer drought of Central Asia. Gardeners can place late-developing plants nearby to fill the developing gap.

Cultivation 

Papaver orientale usually thrives in soil pH 6.5 to 7.5  and in full sun or part shade.  Seeds are sown after the potential of frost has passed, the average temperature is approximately 21 °C and when soil has thoroughly warmed. The seeds are sown at a depth of about one centimeter, or less as light may stimulate germination. Oriental Poppies do not handle transplanting or over-watering well. Germination period is 10–20 days. Mulch can be used to protect the plant over the winter and deadheading will produce a second flower.

Cultivars 
Cultivars (those marked  have gained the Royal Horticultural Society's Award of Garden Merit):-

See also
Oriental Poppies, 1927 painting by Georgia O'Keeffe

References

Sources 
 Garden Guides: Oriental Poppy varieties

External links 

orientale
Garden plants
Plants described in 1753
Taxa named by Carl Linnaeus